The term Team Asia is used in a number of sports to designate a unified team of Asian countries in several sports competitions and sports tournaments.

Competitions featuring an Asia team

Note that in the above sports there also exist national teams taking part in other competitions

References

See also
 Team North America
 Team Europe
 Team World
 Team Africa
 Team Latin America

Sports teams in Asia
Multinational sports teams